Trosky Castle is a castle ruin in the municipality of Troskovice in the Liberec Region of the Czech Republic. It is located on the summits of two basalt volcanic plugs. On the lower peak, is the two-storey structure called Baba (Crone), and on the higher outcrop, is the four-sided structure known as Panna (Maiden). The castle is a landmark of the Bohemian Paradise region.

History

The castle was established by Čeněk of Wartenberg in the second half of the 14th century. Two towers were constructed, one on top of each rock, and various residential buildings and outhouses were erected between them. Three rings of fortified walls protected the complex. After Čeněk's death the castle came into the possession of King Wenceslaus IV, from whom it was acquired by Otto III of Bergau. Though Otto IV of Bergau was a zealous Catholic, it did not stop him raiding the monastery in Opatovice and stealing its famous treasure,  which he is said to have hidden in Trosky Castle, supposedly in an underground cellar blocked by a huge boulder. No one could move the boulder, which was eventually covered by scree, permanently cutting off the way to the precious objects.

During the Hussite Wars Trosky was a centre of the pro-Catholic sides. It is therefore not surprising that in all probability the castle was never completely conquered by the Hussites or any other enemies. As late as 1428, shortly after the castle burned down, it was under siege by Jan Královec, captain of the Taborites Army. From 1438 onwards the robber knight Kryštov Šov of Helfenburg and his companion Švejkar settled in it to tyrannize the villagers in the surrounding countryside, before the people of Görlitz and Zittau, members of the Lusatian League, banded together to capture them. Margareth of Bergau, the widow of the original owner Otto of Bergau, made Trosky into her residence by 1444. In 1468 the castle was property of William of Hasenburg who kept it until 1497. After that several noble families owned the castle, although its significance declined. In 1648, during the Thirty Years' War, it was burned down completely by the Imperial Army and left in ruins. In 1681 the enlightened Jesuit Bohuslav Balbín visited it; possibly the first documented example of a trip, the sole purpose of which was to research a historical site or area.

In the 19th century a greater degree of interest was shown and romantic modifications were made to the ruins of the castle. It was decided to create a staircase leading to the Panna tower. Work has begun in 1841–43, but was not completed.

Gallery

References

External links

Hrad Trosky 
Trosky castle 

Semily District
Volcanoes of the Czech Republic
Volcanic plugs of Europe
Castles in the Liberec Region
Tourist attractions in the Liberec Region
National Cultural Monuments of the Czech Republic
Ruined castles in the Czech Republic